El Álamo is a municipality of the autonomous community of the Community of Madrid in central Spain. It is located in the comarca of Navalcarnero.

References

Municipalities in the Community of Madrid